Jongno 3(sam)-ga Station is an underground station on lines 1, 3 and 5 of the Seoul Subway in South Korea.

In December 2010 the station is recorded as having the fifth highest WiFi data consumption of all the Seoul Metropolitan Subway stations, following Express Bus Terminal Station, Sadang Station, Dongdaemun Station and Jamsil Station.

Station layout

History
The station opened to Line 1 services on August 15, 1974.  On October 18, 1985, services on Line 3 began stopping at Jongno 3(sam)-ga, and on December 30, 1996, Line 5 trains began calling here.

Entrances
The following places are accessible from this station's exits as listed.
 Exit 1: Jongno 1, 2, 3, 4 Ga Dong Office, Jongno 2 Ga Post Office, Jongno 2 Ga Public Safety Centre, Tapgol Park; Insa Dong
 Exit 2; 2-1: Changdeokgung
 Exit 3: Donui Dong; Jongno 3 Ga Fire Station; Jongno 3 Ga Public Safety Centre; Jongmyo; Jongmyo Citizens' Park
 Exit 4: Nakwon Dong
 Exit 5: Seoul Gyodong Primary School; Seoul Unhyeon Primary School; Jongnno 1, 2, 3, 4 Ga Dong Office; Jongno 2 Ha Post Office; Jongno 2 Ga Public Safety Centre; Jongno Tax Office; Tapgol Park
 Exit 6: Jongno 3 Ga Fire Station
 Exit 7: Anguk Dong; Donhwamun; Jongno 3 Ga Public Safety Centre; Changdeokgung
 Exit 8: Myo Dong; Changdeokgung; Jongmyo Citizens' Park
 Exit 9: Jongmyo; Jongno 3 Ga Fire Station; Jongno 3 Ga Public Safety Centre
 Exit 10: Jongmyo; Jongmyo Citizens' Park
 Exit 11: Daerim Shopping
 Exit 12: Jongno 4 Ga
 Exit 13: Jangsa Dong; Cheonggyecheon 3 Ga
 Exit 14: Cheonggyecheon 3 Ga; Seoul Teenagers' Training Centre
 Exit 15: Gwansu Dong; Jongno 2 Ga; Industrial Bank of Korea, End of Jongno

Tourism
In January 2013, the Seoul Metropolitan Rapid Transit Corporation, which operates this line, published free guidebooks in three languages: English, Japanese and Chinese (simplified and traditional), which features eight tours as well as recommendations for accommodations, restaurants and shopping centers. The tours are designed with different themes, e.g. Korean traditional culture, which goes from this station to Anguk Station and Gyeongbokgung Station on line No 3 that showcases antique shops and art galleries of Insa-dong.

References

Seoul Metropolitan Subway stations
Metro stations in Jongno District
Railway stations opened in 1974
Seoul Subway Line 3
Seoul Subway Line 1
Seoul Subway Line 5